Reginald Andre White (born July 11, 1979) is a former American football running back who played one season with the Jacksonville Jaguars of the National Football League. He played college football at Oklahoma State University and attended Liberty High School in Liberty, Texas. He was also a member of the New York Jets, Tennessee Titans, Pittsburgh Steelers, Green Bay Packers and Edmonton Eskimos.

Early years
White earned all-state and all-district honors in both football and basketball for the Liberty High School Panthers. He rushed for 1,209 yards and scored 17 touchdowns his senior year while garnering Offensive Player of the Year accolades. He also participated in track and field for the Panthers.

College career
White played for the Oklahoma State Cowboys from 1998 to 2000. He was redshirted in 1997. He rushed for 1,049 yards and four touchdowns his senior year in 2000.

Professional career

New York Jets
White signed with the New York Jets on April 25, 2001 after going undrafted in the 2001 NFL Draft. He was released by the Jets on September 1, 2001.

Tennessee Titans
White was signed to the Tennessee Titans' practice squad on September 4, 2001. He was released by the Titans on October 17, 2001.

Pittsburgh Steelers
White was signed to the Pittsburgh Steelers' practice squad on October 31, 2001. He was released by the Steelers on November 7, 2001.

Jacksonville Jaguars
White signed with the Jacksonville Jaguars on November 27, 2001 and played in five games for the team during the 2001 season. He was released by the Jaguars on September 1, 2002.

Green Bay Packers
White was signed to the Green Bay Packers' practice squad on December 25, 2002. He was released by the Packers on August 6, 2003.

Edmonton Eskimos
White played in five games for the Edmonton Eskimos in 2004.

References

External links
Just Sports Stats
College stats

Living people
1979 births
Players of American football from Houston
Players of Canadian football from Houston
American football running backs
Canadian football running backs
African-American players of American football
African-American players of Canadian football
Oklahoma State Cowboys football players
Jacksonville Jaguars players
Edmonton Elks players
21st-century African-American sportspeople
20th-century African-American sportspeople